Lara Defour (born 12 November 1997) is a Belgian professional racing cyclist, who currently rides for UCI Women's Continental Team .

References

External links

1997 births
Living people
Belgian female cyclists
Place of birth missing (living people)
People from Roeselare
Cyclists from West Flanders
21st-century Belgian women